Trichophaga scandinaviella is a moth belonging to the family Tineidae. The species was first described by Zagulajev in 1960.

It is native to Northern Europe.

References

Tineinae
Moths described in 1960
Moths of Europe